Embassy of Ukraine in the Netherlands is the diplomatic mission of Ukraine in The Hague, Netherlands. Since 2021, Ambassador Extraordinary and Plenipotentiary of Ukraine to the Kingdom of the Netherlands is Maksym Kononenko.

History of the diplomatic relations

The Kingdom of the Netherlands recognized the independence of Ukraine on December 31, 1991. Diplomatic relations between two countries were established on April 1, 1992, by exchange of diplomatic notes. In mid 1993 the Embassy of Ukraine in the states of Benelux was opened in Brussels, covering also relations with the Netherlands. The full-fledged diplomatic mission of Ukraine to the Kingdom of the Netherlands began its activities in The Hague in May 2002.

See also
 Netherlands–Ukraine relations
 List of diplomatic missions in Netherlands
 Foreign relations of Netherlands
 Foreign relations of Ukraine

References

External links
 

Netherlands–Ukraine relations
Hague
Ukraine